Alfredo Teixeira Moreira (born 1 November 1938) is a retired Portuguese football defender.

External links 
 

1938 births
Living people
Sportspeople from Setúbal
Portuguese footballers
Association football defenders
Primeira Liga players
Sporting CP footballers
Portugal international footballers